Joseph Patrick Reidy (born 1948) is an historian of the American Civil War. He is a professor emeritus and retired associate provost at Howard University.

Reidy earned a BA in sociology from Villanova University, followed in 1974 by an M.A. from Northern Illinois University with a thesis  titled Negro election day and the New England Black community, 1750-1865. He received his PhD in history in 1982, also from Northern Illinois University with a thesis titled Masters and slaves, planters and freedmen: the transition from slavery to freedom in central Georgia, 1820-1880.

Publications 

 Illusions of Emancipation: The Pursuit of Freedom and Equality in the Twilight of Slavery, University of North Carolina Press (2019)
 From Slavery to Agrarian Capitalism in the Cotton Plantation South, Central Georgia 1800-1880, University of North Carolina Press (1995)
 Coeditor with  Ira Berlin and Leslie S Rowland, The black military experience  , part of Freedom: A Documentary History of Emancipation, 1861-1867, Cambridge University Press, 2010

Awards and honors 

 March 2020: Columbia University Bancroft Prize for Illusions of Emancipation: The Pursuit of Freedom and Equality in the Twilight of Slavery
 2020: Gilder Lehrman Lincoln Prize, Finalist for Illusions of Emancipation: The Pursuit of Freedom and Equality in the Twilight of Slavery

References 

Living people
Historians of the American Civil War
21st-century American historians
21st-century American male writers
1948 births
20th-century American historians
20th-century American male writers
Northern Illinois University alumni
Villanova University alumni
Howard University faculty
Bancroft Prize winners
American male non-fiction writers